Michala Hartigová (born 14 November 1983, in Pardubice) is a Czech former basketball player who competed in the 2004 Summer Olympics and in the 2008 Summer Olympics.

References

1983 births
Living people
Czech women's basketball players
Olympic basketball players of the Czech Republic
Basketball players at the 2004 Summer Olympics
Basketball players at the 2008 Summer Olympics
Sportspeople from Pardubice